The Municipality of Medvode is a municipality in the traditional region of Upper Carniola in north-central Slovenia. The seat of the municipality is the town of Medvode. Medvode became a municipality in 1994.

Settlements
In addition to the municipal seat of Medvode, the municipality also includes the following settlements:

 Belo
 Brezovica pri Medvodah
 Dol
 Dragočajna
 Golo Brdo
 Goričane
 Hraše
 Ladja
 Moše
 Osolnik
 Rakovnik
 Seničica
 Setnica
 Smlednik
 Sora
 Spodnja Senica
 Spodnje Pirniče
 Studenčice
 Tehovec
 Topol pri Medvodah
 Trnovec
 Valburga
 Vaše
 Verje
 Vikrče
 Zavrh pod Šmarno Goro
 Zbilje
 Zgornja Senica
 Zgornje Pirniče
 Žlebe

References

External links

Municipality of Medvode on Geopedia
Medvode municipal site

 
Medvode
1994 establishments in Slovenia